Norsk Flyforsikringspool was an insurance pool created by Norwegian insurance companies to handle pooling of aircraft insurance. It was established in 1919 and dissolved in 1996.

References

Insurance companies of Norway
Financial services companies established in 1919
Financial services companies disestablished in 1996
1919 establishments in Norway
1996 disestablishments in Norway